Lust for Life is the fifth studio album by American singer-songwriter Lana Del Rey, released on July 21, 2017, through Polydor and Interscope Records worldwide and Urban Records in Germany. Marking a return to the "hip-hop inspired" sound of her major-label debut, Lust for Life features production from past collaborators Rick Nowels, Kieron Menzies and Emile Haynie, while also working for the first time with producers Boi-1da, Max Martin, Benny Blanco and Metro Boomin. It also features guest appearances from The Weeknd, ASAP Rocky, Stevie Nicks, Sean Lennon, and Playboi Carti. The album and its title were announced on March 29, 2017, through a trailer on Del Rey's official Vevo channel on YouTube.

Lust for Life received positive reviews from music critics and received a nomination for the Grammy Award for Best Pop Vocal Album at the 60th Annual ceremony, becoming Del Rey's second nomination in the category. It appeared on the 2017 year-end best-albums lists from various publications. The album was a global success, topping the charts in twelve counties including the United Kingdom, and United States, while reaching the top five in fifteen territories.

The album was promoted by the release of four singles. The lead single, "Love" was released to critical acclaim and moderate success, peaking at number 44 on the US Billboard Hot 100, while the title track, featuring the Weeknd, peaked at number 64. "Summer Bummer" featuring ASAP Rocky and Playboi Carti; and "Groupie Love" also featuring ASAP Rocky were released as the third and fourth singles in the United Kingdom and Italy respectively. Del Rey embarked on her fourth headlining concert tour, entitled LA to the Moon Tour, which commenced on January 5, 2018, and concluded on August 10, 2018.

Background and release
Lana Del Rey first discussed the follow-up album to Honeymoon during an interview with NME magazine in December 2015. When asked where she would like to go with it and when it would be released, she replied by saying, "I do have early thoughts about what I'd like to do with it. My label, Interscope, is pretty flexible and open to my records coming out at any time, so I don't have that pressure. I'm just happy to be able to keep on making music I can stand behind. That's enough for me." In February 2016, during Clive Davis's Pre-Grammy Gala, Del Rey told Billboard that her upcoming record would be a different direction from Honeymoon, while retaining the same aesthetic.

On February 18, 2017, the album's lead single, "Love", was released. On April 18, in an interview with Courtney Love for Dazed, Del Rey confirmed a collaboration on the album with the Weeknd called "Lust for Life", and a collaboration with Sean Lennon called "Tomorrow Never Came". She claimed to have worked with Max Martin for the title track, and was inspired by The Shangri-Las for the record's sound. A collaboration with Stevie Nicks entitled "Beautiful People, Beautiful Problems" was also confirmed to be featured on the album. The second single, "Lust for Life", was released on April 19. The title of the album was announced on March 29, 2017, when Del Rey released a trailer for the album, and the album's cover art was released by Del Rey on social media on April 11, 2017. The album was released on July 21, 2017.

Composition
Lust for Life mixes numerous music styles. It was described by Stereogum as "Lana Del Rey’s version of an A-list pop album, with a big budget and big-name contributors." Its sound was also described as "new-age folk" by Billboard and "trap pop" by Vulture. Rolling Stone defined Lust for Life "her poppiest turn since her debut". The record features recurring trap rhythms, classic rock references, "sepia-toned" orchestral backings, and Del Rey singing with a "hip-hop affectation". The Daily Telegraph stated that the album "lets a bit of light into the darkness of Del Rey's moody past works," noting that "there's a sense of heightened drama in punchy Phil Spector style sixties back beats and the way the heavy timpani criss-crosses with echoing digital trap beats, all swathed in a gauzy haze of Shangri Las style girl group harmonies." The Guardian described the album's sound as "sleek contemporary-sounding soundscapes," and noted "Summer Bummer"'s "eerie production and futuristic melancholy sounding closer to a track from Frank Ocean's Blonde than her usual 50s and 60s enthralled shtick." The A.V. Club praised its modern simplicity, noting that "its beats are subtle hip-hop twitches or electro-pop swells, with percussion redolent of faraway fireworks booms or mellifluous melodic washes." Pitchfork stated that the album "presented alt-pop’s quintessential sad girl as actually—could it be?—happy."

Promotion

Singles
In January 2017, the lead single from the record, "Love", was registered online on Harry Fox Agency under the alternate title "Young in Love". Fans began the speculate that the song would be featured on Del Rey's upcoming record, and on February 17, 2017, promotional posters for the "Love" music video directed by Rich Lee were put on display across Los Angeles. Later that day, the song leaked online, forcing Del Rey to officially release the song earlier than she had expected. The song was officially released worldwide on February 18, and the music video on February 20. "Love" debuted at number 44 on the Billboard Hot 100 and number two on Hot Rock Songs. On April 19, BBC Radio 1 premiered Del Rey's new song, "Lust for Life", featuring singer the Weeknd. The official audio was released to the iTunes Store and streaming services a few hours later as the second single from the album.
"Summer Bummer" featuring ASAP Rocky and Playboi Carti was released to UK radio as the third single from the album on July 28, 2017. "Groupie Love" featuring ASAP Rocky was released to Italian radio as the fourth single from the album on July 28, 2017.

Promotional singles
On May 15, Del Rey released "Coachella – Woodstock in My Mind" as the album's first promotional single.

Though not released as a single, "White Mustang" was accompanied by a music video published on September 17, 2017. The video illustrates a futuristic Los Angeles in an aesthetic reminiscence of "High by the Beach". It was released as the second promotional single.

Tour

On July 24, 2017, Del Rey began a small promotional tour at the Brixton Academy in London in promotion of Lust for Life. Other stops on the promotional tour include San Diego, Anaheim, Glasgow, Liverpool, San Francisco, Santa Barbara and New York City. Aside from these select side shows, Del Rey embarked on an official world tour entitled the LA to the Moon Tour to further promote the album, as her first official headlining concert tour since The Endless Summer Tour in 2015. The tour began on January 5, 2018, in Minneapolis, Minnesota, and further includes shows in North America, South America, Australia and Europe. Del Rey was accompanied by Kali Uchis and Jhene Aiko as opening acts.

Critical reception

Lust for Life received positive reviews. At Metacritic, which assigns a normalized rating out of a 100 to reviews from mainstream publications, the album received an average score of 77, based on 26 reviews, indicating "generally favorable reviews", becoming Del Rey's second best reviewed album at the time, behind Honeymoon (2015).

Neil McCormick of The Daily Telegraph said the album is a "welcome throwback to the hip hop swagger that pushed through her fantastic 2012 debut Born to Die". Jon Pareles of The New York Times wrote a favorable review, saying the album "in rare moments, hints at a wink behind Ms. Del Rey's somber lullabies." In a very positive review from GQ Magazine, Kevin Long wrote that "Like Lorde's Melodrama, Lust for Life is an accomplished piece of art, an antidote to the banal tunes permeating the charts and one of the best albums released this year so far."

Billboard named Lust for Life their album of the week, writing "In a 2017 pop game riddled with thirst, trend-hops and burn-outs, Lana Del Rey has earned a remarkable, singular consistency." Writing for The Independent, Roison O'Connor wrote that "Lust For Life is more of an elaboration on her favourite subjects rather than a repetition, in fact, it's her most expansive album to date," concluding that "Del Rey is far more self-aware than she has been on her previous albums." El Hunt of DIY wrote that Lust for Life is "a record that is prepared to be truly vulnerable, and is all the more impactful for it."

Commercial performance
Lust for Life debuted at number one on the US Billboard 200 with 107,000 album-equivalent units of which 80,000 were pure album sales, marking Del Rey's second number one on the chart. The album also notably kept Tyler The Creator’s Flower Boy from the number one spot by 1,000 units  The record also debuted at number one on the UK Albums Chart with sales of 24,972 copies giving Del Rey her third number-one album on the chart. In South Korea, the album debuted at number 57 on the Gaon Album Chart and at number five on the international version of the same chart.

Accolades

Awards and nominations

Year End Lists

Track listing

Notes
  signifies an additional producer

Sample credits
 "13 Beaches" contains an audio snippet from the motion picture Carnival of Souls performed by Candace Hilligoss

Personnel
Credits adapted from the album's liner notes.

 Lana Del Rey – vocals , production , additional production 
 The Weeknd – vocals 
 ASAP Rocky – vocals 
 Playboi Carti – vocals 
 Stevie Nicks – vocals, backing vocals 
 Sean Ono Lennon – vocals , production , shaker , timpani , electric upright bass , acoustic guitar , electric guitar , celesta , harpsichord , glass harmonica , Mongolian bells , Mellotron 
 Rick Nowels – bass , Mellotron , vibraphone , keyboards , synth pads , piano , strings , celesta , organ , acoustic guitar , flute , 808 bass , solina , synth bass , electric piano , choir 
 Kieron Menzies – production , engineering , mixing , drums , tape loops , percussion , keyboards , synth pads , strings , bass , synthesizer , modem , piano 
 Dean Reid – production , engineering , mixing , electric guitar , drums , percussion , bass guitar , vocoder , effects , guitar synthesizer , synth bass , bass , strings , synthesizer , flute , Mellotron , brass 
 Zac Rae – synthesizer , strings , harpsichord , drums , percussion , bass guitar , electric guitar , piano , organ , Mellotron , guitar 
 Patrick Warren – harmonium , synthesizer , waterphone , tack piano , strings , piano , organ , bassoon , flute 
 Mighty Mike – additional production , bongos , drums , percussion , keyboards , percussion 
 David Levita – electric guitar 
 Trevor Yasuda – engineering , keyboards 
 Aaron Sterling – live drums , tambourine , percussion 
 Tim Larcombe – additional production , electric guitar , drums , Mellotron 
 Metro Boomin – production , drums , percussion , synth bass 
 Benny Blanco – production , mixing , drums , keyboards 
 Max Martin – additional production , Juno bass 
 Ali Payami – drum programming 
 Dan Heath – orchestra overture 
 David Palmer – synthesizer 
 Sean Hurley – bass 
 T-Minus – cello , synth 
 Boi-1da – production , drums , bass 
 Jahaan Sweet – production , piano 
 Andrew Joseph Gradwohl Jr. – synthesizer 
 Berkay Birecikli – percussion 
 Hector Delgado – engineering , effects 
 Emile Haynie – production , mixing , drums , synthesizer 
 Gary Ferguson – live drums 
 Chris Garcia – engineering 
 Jordan Stilwell – engineering 
 Matthew Cullen – engineering , mixing 
 Adam Ayan – mastering 
 Mike Bozzi – mastering 
 Chuck Grant – photography
 Neil Krug – photography
 Mat Maitland – design
 Markus Bagå – design

Charts

Weekly charts

Year-end charts

Certifications

See also 
List of UK Albums Chart number ones in 2017
List of number-one albums of 2017 (Sweden)
List of number-one albums of 2017 (Australia)
List of number-one albums of 2017 (Canada)
List of number-one albums of 2017 (Mexico)
List of number-one albums of 2017 (Norway)
List of number-one albums of 2017 (Spain)
List of Billboard 200 number-one albums of 2017

References

2017 albums
Albums produced by Benny Blanco
Albums produced by Boi-1da
Albums produced by Emile Haynie
Albums produced by Metro Boomin
Albums produced by Rick Nowels
Albums recorded at Electric Lady Studios
Interscope Records albums
Lana Del Rey albums
Polydor Records albums
Albums involved in plagiarism controversies
Trap music albums
Folk albums by American artists